is a yaoi manga by You Asagiri and serialized in Magazine Be-Boy by Biblos.

Plot

The story is about Shun, a young man who works very hard to live up to the memory of his older brother, who in his eyes was always better than him at everything he ever did. Shun tries his best to live up to his brother's memory, so much so that he is willing to sacrifice everything that is important to him, even at the cost of his own personal life. And suddenly, a beautiful young stranger comes into his troubled life and takes Shun on a ride down a dangerous road of love, loss, lust, guilt, passion, and taboo (places that he has never visited before in his quiet troubled life)! And this places will bring a lot of pain to Shun if he is not careful to protect himself from the danger that will come ahead of him. Shun is a young man who due to all the hard work he has done in order to live up to his big brother wants more for himself. This young man craves excitement in his life; due to this and all the other troubles he has in his life, the stranger gives it to him, but at a high price that could be too high for him to pay.

Book information
This yaoi manga, like many others, are sold in shrink-wrapped and carries an 18+ age advisory sticker to warn buyers about explicit content.

In 2010, Animate USA announced that it would republish Golden Cain in English on the Amazon Kindle format.

References

External links
Golden Cain Rated #1
Golden Cain Rated #2
anime tourist Information
Manga Information
Mania.com review
Sheena McNeil review at Sequential Tart
Kat Avila review at Sequential Tart
Katherine Keller review at Sequential Tart

Yaoi anime and manga
CPM Press